Jürgen Kraft (26 November 1951 – 11 June 2002) was a German racing cyclist. He won the German National Road Race in 1977.

References

External links
 

1951 births
2002 deaths
German male cyclists
People from Giessen (district)
Sportspeople from Giessen (region)
German cycling road race champions
Cyclists from Hesse
20th-century German people